L. W. Miller III (born July 20, 1973) is an American professional stock car racing driver. He is a member of the Earnhardt family, as the husband of Kelley Earnhardt Miller. Miller is the 2008 NASCAR Whelen Southern Modified Tour champion and competed in that series full-time from 2006 to 2011 and part-time in 2012. He has also competed part-time in what is now the NASCAR Xfinity Series, the NASCAR Craftsman Truck Series, what is now the ARCA Menards Series, what is now the ARCA Menards Series East, and the NASCAR Whelen Modified Tour in the past.

Racing career

Miller has 13 NASCAR Busch Series starts. In his first start at Daytona International Speedway, he started 37th and finished 32nd after an oil leak. He also has six NASCAR Craftsman Truck Series starts, all coming in 2003. In his first start, he started 28th and finished 21st after a crash.

Motorsports career results

NASCAR
(key) (Bold – Pole position awarded by qualifying time. Italics – Pole position earned by points standings or practice time. * – Most laps led.)

Busch Series

Craftsman Truck Series

Busch North Series

Whelen Modified Tour

Whelen Southern Modified Tour

ARCA Re/Max Series
(key) (Bold – Pole position awarded by qualifying time. Italics – Pole position earned by points standings or practice time. * – Most laps led.)

References

External links
 
 

1973 births
NASCAR drivers
Living people
Racing drivers from Pennsylvania
ARCA Menards Series drivers